Dhala crater (N25°17'59.7" and E78°8'3.1") is a crater formed by an asteroid impact. It is situated near Bhonti village in Pichhore block of Shivpuri district of Madhya Pradesh state in India. It is the largest crater in India, and between the Mediterranean and Southeast Asia. The diameter of the structure is estimated at 3 km, while other sources estimate its diameter to be 11 km diameter. It is the second such crater found in India, after Lonar lake. 

It is 200 km east of the Ramgarh crater, the location of 11th century Bhand Deva Temple which was renovated by INTACH in 2018.

Impact date 

It is estimated that the impact occurred between 2.44 and 2.24 Ga. Basement rocks are predominantly composed of granitoids.

Largest in India

This crater on the Bundelkhand craton is the largest crater in India.

See also

 Impact craters in India
 Lonar crater at Lonar in Buldhana district of Maharashtra
 Luna crater at Kutch district of Gujarat
 Ramgarh Crater in Mangrol tehsil of Baran district of Rajasthan
 Shiva crater, an undersea super crater west of India 

 Other related topics
 List of impact craters on Earth
 List of possible impact structures on Earth
 List of lakes in India
 List of national parks of India
 Ramsar Convention
 Soda lake
 Tiger reserves of Maharashtra

References

Further reading

External links
 Google map link

Impact craters of India
Landforms of Madhya Pradesh
Proterozoic impact craters